Raja Raymond Gosnell (born December 9, 1958) is an American filmmaker and editor. He is best known for directing comedies including Never Been Kissed, Big Momma's House, and Scooby-Doo. As well as family films including Home Alone 3 and Yours, Mine & Ours

Early life 
Gosnell is named after his father's friend Raja Mohideen. He was born in Los Angeles, California on December 9, 1958.

Career 
Gosnell's career started in 1980 when he worked with director Robert Altman as an assistant editor on Popeye. His first solo credit as an editor was on the film The Silence. Afterward, Gosnell would serve as editor on a number of films, including Teen Wolf Too, Pretty Woman, and Rookie of the Year.

He is also known for his collaboration with director Chris Columbus, for whom he edited the films Home Alone, Home Alone 2: Lost in New York, and Mrs. Doubtfire.

Gosnell made his directorial debut with Home Alone 3 after learning writer and producer John Hughes was looking for a director for the project. Afterwards, he went on to direct more theatrical films, including Never Been Kissed, Big Momma's House, Scooby-Doo, Beverly Hills Chihuahua, and The Smurfs. While many of his films have been met with poor reception from critics, they have generally been very successful at the box office. In 2021, Gosnell co-directed his son, Bradley, in Gun and a Hotel Bible alongside Alicia Joy LeBlanc.

Filmography
Director

Executive Producer
 Smurfs: The Lost Village (2017)
 Show Dogs (2018)

Editor

References

External links

1958 births
American film editors
Film directors from Los Angeles
Living people
Comedy film directors
People from Los Angeles